HMS Forfar was a Hunt-class minesweeper of the Royal Navy from World War I.

See also
 Forfar

References

 

 

Hunt-class minesweepers (1916)
Ships built in Dundee
1918 ships